Brent Fisher (born 6 July 1983) is a New Zealand association football striker who last played for Port Melbourne Sharks in the NPL Victoria.

Club career
Fisher attended Christchurch Boys' High School and turned out for Canterbury United when only 17 years of age. He then played for two seasons in the Australian NSL before moving to Germany's Energie Cottbus in January 2005. He returned to New Zealand after a short spell in Norway, then signed up for another Scandinavian side, Bodens BK.

His 2006 season at Bodens BK was spoilt by an early injury, and some other problems. Following a promising comeback in the Autumn, Fisher and the club decided to sign a renewed contract for 2007, and also for 2008, for a third season. During 2008 he was again injured.

International career
In 1999, he was member of the New Zealand squad at the FIFA Under-17 World Cup held in Auckland.

Fisher made his full All Whites debut as a substitute in an international friendly 2–3 loss to Estonia on 13 October 2002 and ended his international playing career with nine A-international caps and four goals to his credit, his final cap, also a substitute appearance, in a 1–0 win over Malaysia on 19 February 2006.

References

External links
 
 

1983 births
Living people
New Zealand association footballers
New Zealand expatriate association footballers
New Zealand international footballers
National Soccer League (Australia) players
Bodens BK players
FC Energie Cottbus players
Northern Spirit FC players
Port Melbourne SC players
2. Bundesliga players
Expatriate soccer players in Australia
Expatriate footballers in Germany
New Zealand expatriate sportspeople in Australia
New Zealand expatriate sportspeople in Germany
2004 OFC Nations Cup players
National Premier Leagues players
People educated at Christchurch Boys' High School
Association football forwards